American Entomologist may refer to more than one publication.

The American Entomologist (R.P. Studley & Co. journal), also known as The American Entomologist and Botanist, published by R.P. Studley & Co. in  1868 (vol. 1) and  1870 (vol. 2), then by Max Jaegerhuber in 1880 (vol. 3).
American Entomologist (Oxford University Press journal), published by the Oxford University Press, originally established as Bulletin of the Entomological Society of America in 1955.